Ireland's "Vanishing Triangle" is a term commonly used in the Irish media when referring to a number of high-profile disappearances of Irish women in the mid to late 1990s.

Background
The "Vanishing Triangle" disappearances cases all appeared to share some common characteristics. The women's ages range from late teens to late 30s, they disappeared inexplicably and suddenly, and no substantial clues or evidence of their fate has ever been found despite large scale searches and campaigns by the Irish police force (or Gardaí) to find them. The triangle is in the eastern part of the island, roughly the boundaries of Leinster. Due to similarities in the cases, a popular hypothesis is that they may be the result of a serial killer or killers being active in the area during this period. The cases of these missing women feature in the Irish media periodically and the disappearances have been the subject in a number of unsolved crime documentaries, the TV-3 (Irl) production "Disappeared in the Mountains" being one example.
Irish police set up Operation Trace to focus on unsolved disappearance, but to date this has failed to turn up any substantial clues as to the fate of the women despite a €10,000 reward offered for information resulting in the recovery of a body.

The missing women 

The following women are usually included in the unofficial listing:

Annie McCarrick, 26, of Long Island, New York, went missing on 26 March 1993. She was living in Sandymount, Co. Dublin. The last confirmed sighting of her was at a post office in Enniskerry, Co. Wicklow. However, there was an unconfirmed sighting of her outside Johnnie Fox's Pub in Glencullen, Co. Dublin. This sighting was by a doorman of the pub who said she was with an unknown man. They left the lounge of Johnny Fox's Pub and entered the cabaret room where the unknown man paid for both of them to enter. McCarrick had invited her friend, Hilary Brady and his girlfriend, Rita Fortune to dinner at her apartment the next day. When McCarrick was not there, they contacted her parents in New York and she was reported missing. McCarrick's parents, John and Nancy McCarrick arrived in Ireland shortly after their daughter was reported missing, but left after a six-month long unsuccessful search for McCarrick.
Eva Brennan, 39, of Rathgar, Co. Dublin, went missing on 25 July 1993. 
Imelda Keenan, 22, of Mountmellick, Co. Laois, went missing on 3 January 1994. She was living in Waterford City, Co. Waterford. She had initially gone to stay with one of her brothers in Cobh, Co. Cork, but left it after a short while when she went to stay with two other brothers in Waterford City. She was living with her boyfriend Mark Wall. They both lived in an apartment in the town on William Street. Keenan attended the Central Technical Institute in Waterford where she undertook a computer course for a short period. Keenan told Wall that she was going to the post office. Keenan left the apartment at 1:30 pm and walked down William Street onto Lombard Street. The last confirmed sighting of Keenan is at this time when she was seen crossing the road by a local doctor's secretary who knew her well. The secretary and a friend observed Keenan crossing the road at the corner of the Tower Hotel and Lombard Street. She was never seen again.
Josephine "JoJo" Dullard, 21, of Callan, Co. Kilkenny, went missing on 9 November 1995. She was living in Harold's Cross, Co. Dublin. She had recently dropped out of a beauty therapy course after finding it very difficult to juggle work and college. On the day she disappeared, she was planning on moving home to Callan. She had missed her bus home to Callan and had to take a bus to Naas, Co. Kildare instead. She disappeared in the Moone area of Kildare. She was hitchhiking home from Dublin to Kilkenny. She had been driven from the Dublin area to Kilcullen, Co. Kildare and then from Kilcullen to Moone. She was last seen using a payphone and through telephone records, police found out the call was made at 11:37 pm to Dullard's friend, Mary Cullinan. She ended the call as she was about to enter another car. There was also an unconfirmed sighting of her walking along the road in Castledermot, Co. Kildare. The driver of the car has never been identified.
Fiona Pender, 25, of Tullamore, Co. Offaly, went missing on 23 August 1996. She was last seen leaving her apartment by her boyfriend, John Thompson. Pender was seven months pregnant at the time of her disappearance. In 2008, a small wooden cross bearing the name "Fiona Pender" was found on The Slieve Bloom Way at the border between Laois and Offaly, which led to the belief that Fiona was buried in the Slieve Bloom Mountains.
Ciara Breen, 17, of Dundalk, Co. Louth, went missing on 13 February 1997. She was last seen by her mother Bernadette, who said at the time they had both gone to bed just after midnight. After 2 am, Bernadette got up to go to the toilet and discovered she was missing. She had left a window on the latch and it is believed she did so, so that she could climb back in. In 2014, two credible witnesses came forward with sightings of Ciara from the night she disappeared and in 2015, a man in his 50s was arrested, but released without charge.
Fiona Sinnott, 19, of Rosslare, Co. Wexford, went missing on 8 February 1998.
Deirdre Jacob, 18, of Newbridge, Co. Kildare, went missing on 28 July 1998. She was living in Twickenham, London and studying at St Mary's University but was home for the summer. She disappeared just yards from her parents' home as she walked home. This particular case is often said to be the most puzzling as Jacob was almost home. Passing motorists witnessed Jacob approaching within yards of her parents driveway as well as numerous other sightings, but she never made it to her house. No trace has ever been found and she was never seen again.

The last disappearance to be included on the list was Sinnott in 1998. Since then, no case of disappearances has been of a nature so unexplained and random as to be added to this list. A convicted rapist, Larry Murphy has been suspected of being responsible for the disappearances of Annie McCarrick, JoJo Dullard, and Deirdre Jacob, all of whom vanished close to the area where Murphy lived at the time. Eva Brennan and Fiona Pender have also been linked to the murders of Antoinette Smith and Patricia Doherty. Smith, a 27-year-old separated mother of two, went missing in July 1987. Her body was discovered the following June in a shallow grave at Kilakee, in the foothills of the Dublin mountains. Doherty, age 34, disappeared while shopping on 23 December 1991. In June 1992, her remains were found by men digging turf in the same area of the Dublin mountains. Although it is possible that a serial killer may have been involved in some of the disappearances, the suspect in Fiona Sinnott's case is a man who was well known to her.

Renewed interest in 2012
The disappearances came to an end by 2000 but in late October 2012, there was renewed interest in the unofficial list of missing women when news broke of a 30-year-old pregnant Laois woman named Aoife Phelan, who inexplicably disappeared as she walked home from the house of a friend. Her remains were later found and a 24-year-old man who was known to her has been charged with her murder. He is too young to have been connected with the other cases, which occurred when he would have been aged five to ten.

Possible explanations and suspects
It is widely suspected that at least some if not all of the disappearances were due to a possible serial killer, acting either alone or with an accomplice, in the Leinster area in the 1990s. Irish police have often claimed that Larry Murphy (a native of Baltinglass, a village well within the triangle) is the main suspect in at least some of the cases. Murphy was convicted and imprisoned in 2001 for the rape and attempted murder of a Carlow business woman in 2000. He was attempting to strangle her in a wooded area of the Wicklow Mountains at night when he was surprised by two hunters who happened upon the scene and intervened, saving the woman.
 
Larry Murphy has maintained that he is unconnected with the disappearances and has been questioned on the cases on numerous occasions by the police. To date there is no solid evidence connecting Murphy with the disappearances. It is widely known, though, that Murphy, a carpenter, had completed some work in a shop owned by Ms Jacob's grandmother.

See also
List of fugitives from justice who disappeared

References

1990s crimes in the Republic of Ireland
1990s missing person cases
Fugitives
Irish serial killers
Missing person cases in Ireland
Unidentified serial killers